The Halina Czerny-Stefańska in memoriam is an international piano competition taking place in Poznań under the patronage of the Polish Ministry of Culture. Its first edition took place in September 2008.

Prize Winners
{| border="1"
|+ Winners
! Year
|-
!2008 !! Grand prize !! 1st prize !! 2nd prize !! 3rd prize (ex-a.)
|-
|| ||  Olga Stezhko ||  Przemysław Witek ||  Radosław Sobczak ||  Pavel Kolesnikov
|- 
|| || || || ||  Jae-Kyung Yoo
|-
! !! !! !! !! 4th prize
|-
|| || || || ||  Rinaldo Zhok
|-
! !! !! !! !! 5th prize
|-
|| || || || ||  Anna Solovieva
|-
! !! !! !! !! 6th prize
|-
|| || || || ||  Helene Tysman
|-
|}

References
 Alink-Argerich Foundation - Competition results 2008

External links
 Official webpage

Piano competitions
Music competitions in Poland